William E. Hoehle was a member of the Wisconsin State Assembly.

Biography
Hoehle was born on March 17, 1866, in Kings County, New York. In 1869, he moved to Port Washington, Wisconsin. After residing in Green Bay, Wisconsin, Oshkosh, Wisconsin, Appleton, Wisconsin, and Sheboygan, Wisconsin, Hoehle became a lawyer in 1887 and settled in West Superior, Wisconsin.

Political career
Hoehle was a member of the Assembly during the 1899 session. Previously, he was President of the West Superior Board of Education in 1893 and City Attorney of West Superior in 1895. He was a Republican.

References

External links
The Political Graveyard

Politicians from Brooklyn
People from Port Washington, Wisconsin
Politicians from Green Bay, Wisconsin
Politicians from Oshkosh, Wisconsin
Politicians from Appleton, Wisconsin
Politicians from Sheboygan, Wisconsin
Politicians from Superior, Wisconsin
Republican Party members of the Wisconsin State Assembly
Wisconsin city attorneys
School board members in Wisconsin
19th-century American lawyers
1866 births
Year of death missing
19th-century American politicians